The Selztal Group is a geologic group in Germany. It preserves fossils dating back to the Paleogene period.

See also

 List of fossiliferous stratigraphic units in Germany

References
 

Geologic groups of Europe
Geologic formations of Germany
Paleogene Germany